The De Beers Diamond Oval is a cricket stadium in Kimberley, Northern Cape, South Africa. It opened in 1973 and has a capacity of 11,000. It is currently used mostly for cricket matches and is the home venue of both the VKB Knights, in the Sunfoil Series, and Northern Cape (formerly Griqualand West), in the CSA Provincial Competitions. Griqualand West left the old De Beers Stadium ahead of the 1973–74 season and have been resident at the Diamond Oval since then.

The ground is in the Cassandra suburb of Kimberley at the junction of Lardner Burke Avenue with Dickenson Avenue. It is adjacent to the Kimberley Country Club and close to the De Beers company's technical training campus.

International Centuries
 ten ODI centuries have been scored at the venue.

International five-wicket hauls
Six five-wicket hauls have been taken on the ground, three in men's ODIs and two in women's ODIs.

References

External links
 De Beers Diamond Oval on ESPNcricinfo

Cricket grounds in South Africa
Buildings and structures in Kimberley, Northern Cape
2003 Cricket World Cup stadiums
Multi-purpose stadiums in South Africa
Sports venues in the Northern Cape
De Beers